Patricia Mayayo Bost (born 1967) is a Spanish art historian, professor, and researcher. Her areas of research and study include the historiography of feminist and queer art, the history of women artists, and contemporary artistic practices.

Biography
Patricia Mayayo Bost was born in  Madrid, 1967.
She holds a Ph.D. in Art History from the Autonomous University of Madrid (UAM) and an M.A. in Art History from Case Western Reserve University (Ohio, USA). Between 1998 and 2006, she was a professor of Art History at the European University of Madrid (UEM) and is currently a full professor at UAM. She was the coordinator of the University master's degree in Contemporary Art History and Visual Culture, which is taught at the Museo Nacional Centro de Arte Reina Sofía (MNCARS).

She has directed courses on gender differences and their representation in art and cinema for different museums and contemporary Spanish art centers.

Mayayo collaborated in the realization of the feminism itinerary for the permanent collection at MNCARS, which questions the visibility and role of women in the History of Art. This itinerary was written by Marian Lopez Fernandez-Cao and was presented for the first time in 2009 at MNCARS.

In 2009, Mayayo was one of the founders of the Asociación de Mujeres en las Artes Visuales along with Rocio de la Villa and was a member of the board of directors. In 2012–2013, with Juan Vicente Aliaga, Mayayo curated the exhibition "Feminist genealogies in Spanish art 1960-2010", at the Museo de Arte Contemporáneo de Castilla y León, León, Spain, with the participation of, among others, Marisa Gonzalez, Paloma Navares, Esther Ferrer, Carmen Calvo, and Marina Núñez. The exhibition proposed a review of the role of feminist discourses in the Spanish context from the sixties to 2010.

Exhibitions
 "Feminist genealogies in Spanish art 1960-2010", 2012–13, Museo de Arte Contemporáneo de Castilla y León

Selected works

Books
 Louise Bourgeoi, 1990, 
 André Masson : mitologías, 2002 
 Historias de mujeres, historias del arte, 2003, 
 Frida Kahlo : contra el mito, 2008, 
 Cuerpos sexuados, cuerpos de (re)producción, 2011, 
 Genealogías feministas en el arte español (with Juan Vicente Aliaga), 2013,

Articles
 "Barcelona en blanco y negro : la politización del debate urbano en el entorno de la 'gauche divine'", Arte, Individuo y Sociedad, 32, 1 July 2020

References

1967 births
Living people
People from Madrid
Spanish art historians
Autonomous University of Madrid alumni
Case Western Reserve University alumni